Richard David Ellmann, FBA (March 15, 1918 – May 13, 1987) was an American literary critic and biographer of the Irish writers James Joyce, Oscar Wilde, and William Butler Yeats. He won the U.S. National Book Award for Nonfiction for James Joyce (1959), which is one of the most acclaimed literary biographies of the 20th century. Its 1982 revised edition was similarly recognised with the award of the James Tait Black Memorial Prize. Ellmann was a liberal humanist, and his academic work focused on the major modernist writers of the twentieth century.

Life
Ellmann was born in Highland Park, Michigan, the second of three sons of James Isaac Ellman, a lawyer, and his wife Jeanette (née Barsook). His father was a Romanian Jew and his mother was a Ukrainian Jew from Kyiv. Ellmann served in the United States Navy and Office of Strategic Services during World War II. He studied at Yale University, receiving his B.A. in 1939, his M.A. in 1941, and his PhD (for which he won the John Addison Porter Prize) in 1947. In 1947, he was awarded a B.Litt degree (an earlier form of the M.Litt) from the University of Dublin (Trinity College), where he was resident while researching his biography of Yeats. As a Yale undergraduate at Jonathan Edwards College, Ellmann was a member of Phi Beta Kappa (scholastic honor society); Chi Delta Theta (literary honor society); and, with James Jesus Angleton, a member of the Executive Editorial Board of the Yale Literary Magazine. He achieved "Scholar of the Second Rank" (current equivalent: magna cum laude). The 1939 Yale Banner undergraduate yearbook published an untitled Ellmann account (similar in concept and style to Oscar Wilde's parables which Ellmann later cited in his 1987 biography Oscar Wilde) of a chagrined Joseph, husband of Mary, and Jesus Christ's custodial father:
Joseph was no match for the angel and for Mary's flattering tears. He felt a wince of disappointment at the idea that she had had a vision too, but then she was his wife, and perhaps the whole family now had the prophetic gift. He would have to try it out, on the harvest. Meanwhile he would seek to forget his jealousy, despite the fact that the story sounded a bit fantastic to a reasonable man, which he guessed he was, and it would be well not to talk about it much outside. It was better to leave things the way they were. Not much of a wedding night, but one could tell white lies about that to one's friends.

Ellmann later returned to teach at Yale, and there with Charles Feidelson Jr., he edited the important anthology, The Modern Tradition. He earlier taught at Northwestern, and at the University of Oxford, before serving as Emory University's Robert W. Woodruff Professor from 1980 until his death.

He was Goldsmiths' Professor of English Literature at Oxford University, 1970–1984, then Professor Emeritus, a fellow at New College, Oxford, Oxford, 1970–1987, and an extraordinary fellow at Wolfson College, Oxford, from 1984 until his death. Additionally, he was a Fellow of the British Academy. In 1983 he delivered the British Academy's Sarah Tryphena Phillips Lecture in American Literature and History.

Ellmann used his knowledge of the Irish milieu to bring together four literary luminaries in Four Dubliners: Wilde, Yeats, Joyce, and Beckett (1987), a collection of essays first delivered at the Library of Congress.

His wife, the former Mary Donoghue (1921–1989), whom he married in 1949, was an essayist. The couple had three children: Stephen (b. 1951), a South Africa constitutional scholar, Maud (b. 1954), and Lucy (b. 1956), the first two became academics and the third a novelist and teacher of writing.

Ellmann died of motor neurone disease in Oxford on May 13, 1987, at the age of 69.

Many of his collected papers, artifacts, and ephemera were acquired by the University of Tulsa's McFarlin Library, Department of Special Collections and University Archives. Other manuscripts are housed in the Northwestern University's Library special collections department.

Biographies

Yeats
In Yeats: The Man and the Masks, Ellmann drew on conversations with George Yeats along with thousands of pages of unpublished manuscripts to write a critical examination of the poet's life.

Joyce
Ellmann is perhaps most well known for his literary biography of James Joyce, a revealing account of the life of one of the 20th century's most influential literary figures. Anthony Burgess called James Joyce "the greatest literary biography of the century." Edna O'Brien, the Irish novelist, remarked that "H. G. Wells said that Finnegans Wake was an immense riddle, and people find it too difficult to read. I have yet to meet anyone who has read and digested the whole of it—except perhaps my friend Richard Ellmann." Ellmann quotes extensively from Finnegans Wake as epigraphs in his biography of Joyce.

Wilde
Ellmann's biography Oscar Wilde won a Pulitzer Prize. In it he examined Wilde's ascent to literary prominence and his public downfall. Posthumously Ellmann won both a U.S. National Book Critics Circle Award in 1988 and the 1989 Pulitzer Prize for Biography. The book was the basis for the 1997 film Wilde, directed by Brian Gilbert.

It is considered to be the definitive work on the subject. Ray Monk, a philosopher and biographer, described Ellmann's Oscar Wilde as a "rich, fascinating biography that succeeds in understanding another person".

The Richard Ellmann Lectures
The Richard Ellmann Lectures in Modern Literature at Emory University were established in his honor.

Richard Ellmann Lecturers
 1988  Seamus Heaney
 1990  Denis Donoghue
 1992  Anthony Burgess (resigned; deceased)
 1994  Helen Vendler
 1996  Henry Louis Gates Jr.
 1999  A. S. Byatt
 2001  David Lodge
 2004  Salman Rushdie
 2006  Mario Vargas Llosa
 2008  Umberto Eco
 2010  Margaret Atwood
 2013  Paul Simon
 2017  Colm Tóibín

Bibliography

As author
Yeats: The Man And The Masks (1948; revised edition in 1979)
The Identity of Yeats (1954; second edition in 1964)
James Joyce (1959; revised edition in 1982)
Eminent Domain: Yeats among Wilde, Joyce, Pound, Eliot, and Auden (1970)
Literary Biography: An Inaugural Lecture Delivered Before the University of Oxford on 4 May 1971 (1971)
Ulysses on the Liffey (1972)
Golden Codgers: Biographical Speculations (1976)
The Consciousness of Joyce (1977)
James Joyce's hundredth birthday, side and front views: A lecture delivered at the Library of Congress on March 10, 1982 (1982)
Oscar Wilde at Oxford (1984)
W. B. Yeats's Second Puberty; A Lecture Delivered At The Library Of Congress On April 2, 1984 (1985)
Oscar Wilde (1987) [but see Horst Schroeder: Additions and Corrections to Richard Ellmann's OSCAR WILDE, second edition, revised and enlarged (2002)]
Four Dubliners: Wilde, Yeats, Joyce, and Beckett (1987)
a long the riverrun: Selected Essays (1988)

As editor
 My Brother's Keeper: James Joyce's Early Years (Stanislaus Joyce; ed. Richard Ellmann, 1958)
 The Critical Writings of James Joyce (Eds. Ellsworth Mason and Richard Ellmann, 1959)
 Edwardians and Late Victorians (Edited and with a Foreword by Richard Ellmann, 1960)
 The Modern Tradition: Backgrounds of Modern Literature (with Charles Feidelson, Jr., 1965)
 Letters of James Joyce Vol. 2 (Ed. Richard Ellmann, 1966)
 Letters of James Joyce Vol. 3 (Ed. Richard Ellmann, 1966)
 Giacomo Joyce (James Joyce; ed. Richard Ellmann, 1968)
 Oscar Wilde: a Collection of Critical Essays (Ed. Richard Ellmann, 1969)
 The Artist as Critic: Critical Writings of Oscar Wilde" (Ed. Richard Ellmann, 1969)
 The Norton Anthology of Modern Poetry (Eds. Richard Ellmann and Robert O'Clair, 1973)
 Selected Letters of James Joyce (Ed. Richard Ellmann, 1975)
 Modern Poems: An Introduction to Poetry (Eds. Richard Ellmann and Robert O'Clair, 1976)
 The Picture of Dorian Gray and Other Writings by Oscar Wilde (Ed. Ellmann, 1982)

References

Sources
 Oxford Dictionary of National Biography''

External links
 University of Tulsa McFarlin Library's inventory of the Richard Ellmann collection housed in their special collections department
 Richard Ellmann Papers, Northwestern University Archives, Evanston, Illinois

1918 births
1987 deaths
20th-century American writers
Academics of the University of Oxford
Alumni of Trinity College Dublin
American expatriates in the United Kingdom
American literary critics
United States Navy personnel of World War II
American people of Romanian-Jewish descent
American people of Ukrainian-Jewish descent
Deaths from motor neuron disease
Emory University faculty
Fellows of New College, Oxford
Fellows of the British Academy
Jewish American writers
James Joyce scholars
James Tait Black Memorial Prize recipients
National Book Award winners
Northwestern University faculty
People from Highland Park, Michigan
Pulitzer Prize for Biography or Autobiography winners
People of the Office of Strategic Services
W. B. Yeats scholars
Writers from Michigan
Yale University alumni
Yale University faculty
Neurological disease deaths in England
Members of the American Academy of Arts and Letters